BeiBen Truck (Baotou BeiBen Heavy-Duty Truck Co) is a heavy-truck manufacturer based in Baotou, Inner Mongolia, China.  BeiBen, (North Benz), is part of the North industries Group Corporation (NORINCO).  It was founded in 1988 when BeiBen signed an agreement with Daimler-Benz to manufacture Mercedes-Benz Trucks.  Mercedes was to deliver CKD kits for assembly by BeiBen, and within a few years, the trucks would contain 90% domestic parts.  By 2010, BeiBen was building 40,000 trucks a year.

BeiBen Axle factory produces Mercedes-Benz licensed axles for the heavy duty trucks. Axle models include the planetary hub-reduction axles HL-7/HD-7, and the steering axles VL-4. These axles are well reputed throughout China, Malaysia, Indonesia, South America, South Africa for its robustness and high loading capacity and durability. These axles are in turn used by other truck manufacturers in China as well.

In 2012, BeiBen set up production lines in South Africa and Ethiopia. In Pakistan, Heavy Industries Taxila have been producing the Prime Mover V3 in a joint venture.

In 2014, at the IAA Hannover, a BeiBen V3 prime-mover equipped with the ZF-Astronic gearbox was exhibited by ZF.

2014 also marks the year when BeiBen trucks are equipped with Euro-5 emission engines, delivered to Singapore and Hong Kong.

In April 2018, Beiben exhibited the first Euro-VI compliant trucks at the Beijing Autoshow Exhibition. Singapore became the 1st country to receive the new Euro-VI trucks.

Models
BeiBen V3
BeiBen NG80
 NG80B
BeiBen KK Mining Dump Truck
 Tiema

Specifications
Traditionally, Beiben trucks are equipped with Weichai engines and Fuller FAST transmissions in most markets. Certain models are also equipped with the ZF 16S151 transmission and Deutz air-cooled engines.

ZF and Beiben has a joint venture in Chongqing China, to manufacture ZF Beiben Drivetech transmissions.

The first Beiben Euro-5 truck is equipped with a Euro-5 Weichai WP12-430 engine, coupled with a ZF-Beiben 9T2280 transmission.

The first Automated Manual Transmission (AMT) BEIBEN trucks are equipped with the FAST 16JZSD200 transmission, Euro-5 Weichai engine, successfully delivered to Singapore.

The first Beiben Euro-VI compliant trucks are equipped with a Weichai WP13-500 engine, with a FAST 12JZSD240 AMT transmission, delivered to the local users in Singapore.

References

External links
BeiBen webpage
BeiBen English webpage 
 Beiben Chilean Spanish webpage
BeiBen Singapore webpage
ERSB wedpage
Heavy Industries Taxila Prime Mover V3 webpage
 

Truck manufacturers of China
Mercedes-Benz
Companies based in Baotou
Vehicle manufacturing companies established in 1988
Chinese brands